The 2015 NCAA Division I women's soccer tournament (also known as the 2015 Women's College Cup) was the 34th annual single-elimination tournament to determine the national champion of NCAA Division I women's collegiate soccer. The semi-finals and championship game were played at WakeMed Soccer Park in Cary, North Carolina from December 4–6, 2015 while the preceding rounds were played at various sites across the country during November 2015. The champion was Penn State, who defeated Duke 1–0 in the final.

Qualification

All Division I women's soccer programs were eligible to qualify for the tournament. The tournament field remained fixed at 64 teams. 31 teams received automatic bids by winning their conference tournaments and an additional 33 teams earned at-large bids based on their regular season records.

Teams

Florida State Bracket

Stanford Bracket

Penn State Bracket

Virginia Bracket

College Cup

Statistics

Goalscorers
5 goals

 Morgan Andrews – USC

4 goals

 Emily Ogle – Penn State
 Makenzy Doniak – Virginia

3 goals

 Rachel Hill – Connecticut
 Toni Payne – Duke
 Savannah Jordan – Florida
 Megan Connolly – Florida State
 Frannie Crouse – Penn State
 Megan Schafer – Penn State
 Janine Beckie – Texas Tech
 Alexis Shaffer – Virginia
 Kailey Utley – West Virginia

2 goals

 Hannah Wong – Arizona
 Stephanie Ribeiro – Connecticut
 Christina Gibbons – Duke
 Kayla McCoy – Duke
 Taylor Racioppi – Duke
 Sarah Troccoli – Florida
 Michaela Hahn – Florida State
 Elín Metta Jensen – Florida State
 Isabella Schmid – Florida State
 Berglind Björg Þorvaldsdóttir – Florida State
 Cheyna Williams – Florida State
 Taylor Stainbrook – Minnesota
 Anna Maria Gilbertson – Notre Dame
 Haleigh Echard – Penn State
 Raquel Rodríguez – Penn State
 Charlotte Williams – Penn State
 Mimi Asom – Princeton
 Tyler Lussi – Princeton
 Danielle Henley – South Alabama
 Jordan DiBiasi – Stanford
 Ryan Walker-Hartshorn – Stanford
 Veronica Latsko – Virginia
 Alani Johnson – Virginia Tech
 Michaela Abam – West Virginia

1 goal

 Jessica Nelson – Arizona
 Sheaffer Skadsen – Arizona
 Hannah Alspach – Auburn
 Logan Beal – Auburn
 Kristen Dodson – Auburn
 Taylor Troutman – Auburn
 Lauren Berman – Boston College
 McKenzie Meehan – Boston College
 Alexandra Cooper – Boston University
 Clare Pleuler – Boston University
 Sophia Maccagnone – Butler
 Elena Medeiros – BYU
 Bizzy Phillips Bowen – BYU
 Christina Burkenroad – Cal State Fullerton
 Jessica Simonian – Cal State Fullerton
 Rebecca Wilson – Cal State Fullerton
 Shannon Horgan – Clemson
 Abby Jones – Clemson
 Paige Reckert – Clemson
 Miranda Weslake – Clemson
 Kim Urbanek – Connecticut
 Annie Wickett – Connecticut
 Malinda Allen – Duke
 Imani Dorsey – Duke
 Rebecca Quinn – Duke
 Pamela Begič – Florida
 Meggie Dougherty Howard – Florida
 Shea Rhoney – Florida Gulf Coast
 Paulina Speckmaier – Florida Gulf Coast
 Kaycie Tillman – Florida State
 Grace Damaska – Georgetown
 Melissa Downey – Georgetown
 Madeline Anderson – Hofstra
 Leah Galton – Hofstra
 Whitney White – Howard
 Raquel Angelone – Loyola Marymount
 Sarah Sanger – Loyola Marymount
 Callie Taylor – Loyola Marymount
 Julianna Gernes – Minnesota
 Josee Stiever – Minnesota
 Megan Buckingham – North Carolina
 Alexa Newfield – North Carolina
 Jessie Scarpa – North Carolina
 Michelle Manning – Northwestern
 Sabrina Flores – Notre Dame
 Katie Naughton – Notre Dame
 Kaleigh Olmsted – Notre Dame
 Sammy Edwards – Ohio State
 Arden Holden – Ohio State
 Morgan Wolcott – Ohio State
 Liza Harbin – Ole Miss
 Gretchen Harknett – Ole Miss
 Olivia Harrison – Ole Miss
 Elizabeth Ball – Penn State
 Brittany Basinger – Penn State
 Nickolette Driesse – Penn State
 Kaleigh Riehl – Penn State
 Colby Ciarrocca – Rutgers
 Rachel Cole – Rutgers
 Cassie Inacio – Rutgers
 Brianne Reed – Rutgers
 Madison Tiernan – Rutgers
 Katelyn Walters – Rutgers
 Grace Cutler – Santa Clara
 Ashley Doyle – Santa Clara
 Charde Hannah – South Alabama
 Rio Hardy – South Alabama
 Averie Collins – Stanford
 Megan Turner – Stanford
 Michelle Xiao – Stanford
 Jesse Schaefer – St. John's
 Kate Hajdu – Texas A&M
 Mikaela Harvey – Texas A&M
 Haley Pounds – Texas A&M
 Ally Watt – Texas A&M
 Katrina Guillou – UNC Wilmington
 Lauren Nalevaiko – UNC Wilmington
 Sydney Sladek – USC
 Ayan Adu – Virginia
 Meghan Cox – Virginia
 Candace Cephers – Virginia Tech
 Murielle Tiernan – Virginia Tech
 Pascale Dumesnil – Washington
 Hannah Abraham – West Virginia
 Leah Emaus – West Virginia
 Sh'nia Gordon – West Virginia
 Amanda Hill – West Virginia
 Heather Kaleiohi – West Virginia
 Kelsie Maloney – West Virginia
 Amandine Pierre-Louis – West Virginia
 Carla Portillo – West Virginia
 Leci Irvin – William & Mary
 Rachel Moore – William & Mary

Own goals

 Courtney Schell – Auburn (playing against Florida State)
Unknown – Florida Gulf Coast (playing against South Florida)
 Emily Agudelo – Hofstra (playing against Rutgers)
Unknown – San Jose State (playing against Stanford)
Unknown – South Dakota State (playing against Minnesota)
 Easther Mayi Kith – West Virginia (playing against Loyola Marymount)

See also 
 NCAA Women's Soccer Championships (Division II, Division III)
 NCAA Men's Soccer Championships (Division I, Division II, Division III)

References

NCAA
NCAA Women's Soccer Championship
NCAA Division I Women's Soccer Tournament
NCAA Division I Women's Soccer Tournament
NCAA Division I Women's Soccer Tournament